Arend Harm "Arie" de Winter (1915–1983) was a Dutch football forward who was a member of the Netherlands' squad at the 1938 FIFA World Cup. However, he never made an appearance for the national team. He played 261 matches as an amateur footballer for HFC Haarlem and was captain of the only Haarlem team to win the Dutch championship, in 1946. He married Agatha Klootwijk in 1944 and in 1946 was employed as a civic servant. Little is written about him, and in the past Arie de Winter has also been identified as Adrianus Johannes de Winter (born 1913, Haarlem); however, in the Haarlemse Courant of July 1944, "A.H. de Winter" of the Haarlem football club is reported to have won the annual heptathlon for football players with a record score; the better known J.C. Smit of the same club was in second place.

References

External links
 FIFA profile

1915 births
1983 deaths
Dutch footballers
Association football forwards
HFC Haarlem players
1938 FIFA World Cup players
Sportspeople from Zwolle
Footballers from Haarlem
Footballers from Overijssel